Bagan is a selo and centre of Bagansky District, Novosibirsk Oblast, Russia. It was established in 1914 as a station of railway running between Tatarsk and Slavgorod. 

First it was a centre of the district from 1946 to 1963, and later on from 1965 onwards.

Geography
It lies 450 km South-West from Novosibirsk at the Southern part of Baraba Plain, on the bank of the river with the same name.

References 

Geografija Rosszii (Access date: 2018-05-18)
Baganszkij rajon (Access date: 2018-06-10)

Urban-type settlements in Novosibirsk Oblast